Doot or Paavan Hriday Doot is Gujarati Catholic monthly published from Anand, Gujarat, India since January 1911.

History
The first issue was published by German Jesuit missionary Father Hermanus Zurhausen from the Examiner Press, Bombay (now Mumbai) in January 1911. The publication moved to Anand in 1926 where it is being published by Gujarati Sahitya Prakash Society. The cost of the first issue was two paisa which now increased to  100 annually.

The monthly published its centenary issue in December 2010, the second ever Gujarati magazine after Buddhiprakash. The commemorative postage stamps were released in January 2011.

The magazine has around 5000 subscribers.

Controversy
The February 2012 issue published image of the Most Sacred Heart of Jesus holding a can of beer and cigarette. After controversy, the publisher apologized.

See also
 Varghese Paul, an editor of Doot for 14 years
 List of Gujarati-language magazines

References

1911 establishments in India
Catholic Church in India
Catholic magazines
Christianity in Gujarat
Gujarati-language magazines
Magazines about spirituality
Magazines established in 1911
Mass media in Mumbai
Monthly magazines published in India